The Cathedral of the Resurrection of Christ in Podgorica, Montenegro, 
is a cathedral of the Metropolitanate of Montenegro and the Littoral (MCP) of the Serbian Orthodox Church (SPC). The cathedral is located in the New Town neighborhood of Podgorica, west of the Morača river.

History
Construction of the church of around 14,000 square feet  began in 1993 to a design by Predrag Ristić. Consecration occurred on October 7, 2013, on the occasion of the 1700th anniversary of the Edict of Milan on freedom of religion, and it was attended by the heads of the Eastern Orthodox Churches, Serbian Patriarch Irinej, Ecumenical Patriarch Bartholomew, Jerusalem Patriarch Theophilus III and Russian Patriarch Cyril, together with Metropolitan of Montenegro and the Littoral Amfilohije and other Metropolitanate clerics.

On 1 November 2020, the Metropolitan of Montenegro and the Littoral for the thirty years (1990–2020), Amfilohije was, at his own request, buried in the crypt of the Cathedral of the Resurrection of Christ, in a resting place prepared for his lifespan.

Architecture
The "Orthodox Arts Journal" writes that the cathedral is "certainly one of the most interesting Orthodox churches built in our times. Unlike other new cathedrals we have seen recently, the exterior does not seek to reflect High-Byzantine perfection. Rather, it is a charmingly eccentric design. It has the slightly awkward qualities of any real cathedral, expressing the cultural tensions between the high Imperial style and the capabilities of local craftsmen." The church, with its twin towers and prominent arch is clearly influenced by the medieval Cathedral of St. Tryphon, with Romanesque, Italianate, and Byzantine influences. The interior is heavily adorned with iconographic murals with gold backgrounds, marble floors and  furnishings.

Gallery

References

External links

 Cathedral website (Serbian)
 Metropolitanate of Montenegro and the Littoral (Serbian/English)
 Serbian Orthodox Church (Serbian/English)

Serbian Orthodox church buildings in Montenegro
Serbian Orthodox cathedrals
Tourist attractions in Podgorica
Cathedrals in Montenegro
Buildings and structures in Podgorica
Church buildings with domes
Churches completed in 2014